Broken Bridges is the soundtrack to the 2006 film Broken Bridges, starring American musicians Toby Keith and Lindsey Haun. The album features Keith, Haun, and various other artists. It was released in 2006 via Show Dog Nashville (now Show Dog-Universal Music). The album contains Haun's single "Broken" and Keith's single "Crash Here Tonight".

Content
The album was released on August 29, 2006 via Show Dog-Universal Music (then Show Dog Nashville), a label Keith owned at the time.

Several of the tracks from this album were released as singles and made the Hot Country Songs charts: Scotty Emerick's "What's Up with That" and Lindsey Haun's "Broken" both made No. 52 on the charts in 2006. Keith's own "Crash Here Tonight" also appeared on his 2006 album White Trash with Money, from which it was released as a single that year. "Jacky Don Tucker", the closing track, previously appeared on Keith's 1997 album Dream Walkin'.

The album itself reached a peak of No. 4 on the Top Country Albums chart dated for September 16, 2006.

Critical reception
Giving it 2.5 out of 5 stars, Stephen Thomas Erlewine of Allmusic wrote that "the fact that Keith has brought in such understated songwriters as Fred Eaglesmith and Matraca Berg for his big-screen debut illustrates that he's a more complicated figure than some may initially think. But even if it's in good taste, Broken Bridges is frequently pleasant but rather dull".

Track listing

Charts

Weekly charts

Year-end charts

References

2006 soundtrack albums
Country music soundtracks
Show Dog-Universal Music soundtracks
Albums produced by Toby Keith